Old Hapoel Ground, Petah Tikva was a football ground in Petah Tikva, at the corner of Jewish National Fund and Schapira streets. The ground was in use between 1935 and 1940, when the team moved to their new ground

See also
Sports in Israel

References

Defunct football venues in Israel
Hapoel Petah Tikva F.C.
Sports venues in Petah Tikva